Steven P. Gotaas (born May 10, 1967) is a Canadian former professional ice hockey player who played 49 games in the National Hockey League.  He played with the Minnesota North Stars and Pittsburgh Penguins.

Career statistics

External links 

1967 births
Living people
Canadian ice hockey centres
Ice hockey people from Alberta
Minnesota North Stars players
People from Camrose, Alberta
Pittsburgh Penguins players
Pittsburgh Penguins draft picks